POPKI Sports Hall (Indonesian: Gelanggang Olahraga POPKI) or commonly known as is GOR POPKI a multifunction sports arena in Cibubur, Ciracas, East Jakarta, Jakarta, Indonesia. This arena can be used for basketball, badminton, volleyball, futsal, and taekwondo venues.

References

East Jakarta
Indoor arenas in Indonesia
Handball in Indonesia
Basketball venues in Indonesia
Handball venues in Indonesia
Sports venues in Jakarta
Badminton venues in Jakarta
Basketball venues in Jakarta
Volleyball venues in Jakarta
Gymnastics venues in Jakarta
Venues of the 2018 Asian Games
Asian Games handball venues